Ng Shin Yii (born 8 January 1989) (Pha̍k-fa-sṳ: Vòng Hiûn-ngì) was a Malaysian wushu athlete. She retired at age 27 from international wushu after competing at the World Taijiquan Championships in Poland. She competed in the Taijiquan and Taijijian taolu events. Up until her retirement in 2016, she had represented Malaysia in every World Wushu Championships since 2009, winning one silver and one bronze in the 2009 and 2015 Championships respectively. She competed in the first two World Taijiquan Championships in Dujiangyan and Warsaw achieving three silver medals. At the age of 17, she won a bronze medal at the 2006 Asian Games in Doha, Qatar.

References

External links
 International Wushu Federation Official Website

1989 births
Living people
Malaysian sportswomen
People from Malacca
Malaysian people of Chinese descent
Asian Games medalists in wushu
Wushu practitioners at the 2006 Asian Games
Wushu practitioners at the 2010 Asian Games
Wushu practitioners at the 2014 Asian Games
Asian Games bronze medalists for Malaysia
World Games silver medalists
Medalists at the 2006 Asian Games
Competitors at the 2013 World Games
Southeast Asian Games silver medalists for Malaysia
Southeast Asian Games bronze medalists for Malaysia
Southeast Asian Games medalists in wushu
Competitors at the 2007 Southeast Asian Games
Competitors at the 2011 Southeast Asian Games
Competitors at the 2013 Southeast Asian Games
Competitors at the 2015 Southeast Asian Games
World Games medalists in wushu
Tai chi practitioners